Thomas Gower may refer to:

Sir Thomas Gower (marshal of Berwick), English soldier
Sir Thomas Gower, 1st Baronet (1584 – ), High Sheriff of Yorkshire in 1620
Sir Thomas Gower, 2nd Baronet (died 1672), Royalist and twice High Sheriff of Yorkshire